Braeburn Capital Inc. is an asset management company based in Reno, Nevada and a subsidiary of Apple Inc. Its offices are located at 6900 S. McCarran Boulevard in Reno.

History 
Apple created the company on October 3, 2005 to better manage its assets and to avoid certain California state taxes and taxes from other U.S. states totaling in millions of dollars.

Capital

In 2012, Wall Street analysts calculated that Apple could earn up to $45.6 billion in fiscal year 2012, a record for any American business. By national and international diversions of revenues and many other legal methods, Apple stood to save billions of dollars in taxes.

Name 
The name Braeburn refers to a particular cultivar of apple. This is a play on the name of the parent company Apple Inc.

Personnel
Mick Mulvaney's brother Theodore "Ted" Mulvaney is portfolio manager for Braeburn Capital.

References

American companies established in 2005
Financial services companies established in 2005
2005 establishments in Nevada
Investment management companies of the United States
Apple Inc. subsidiaries
Companies based in Reno, Nevada